There are many translations of the Bible into Serbian and Serbo-Croatian language.

History
Among first translations in Serbian are the famous Codex Marianus (written in Glagolitic script) from 11th century, and Miroslav Gospel (written in Cyrillic script) from 12th century.

In 1561 South Slavic Bible Institute was established for publishing Protestant books translated to South Slavic languages. For this task, the president of this institute Primož Trubar engaged Stjepan Konzul Istranin and Antun Dalmatin as translators for Croatian and Serbian. The Cyrillic text was the responsibility of Antun Dalmatin. The type for printing the Cyrillic-script texts was cast by craftsmen from Nuremberg. The first attempt to use it failed, and the type had to be reconstructed. In 1561 in Tübingen three small books were printed (including Abecedarium and Catechismus) in Croatian in the Glagolitic script. The same books were also printed in Ulach in Serbian with the reconstructed Cyrillic type. For a considerable amount of time, the institute tried to employ a certain Dimitrije Serb to help Istranin and Dalmatin, but without success. Eventually, they managed to employ two Serbian Orthodox priests - Jovan Maleševac from Ottoman Bosnia and Matija Popović from Ottoman Serbia.

At the beginning of the 18th century, Gavrilo Stefanović Venclović translated some 20,000 pages of old biblical literature into vernacular Serbian.

The first Serbian gospel was printed in 1537 in the Rujno Monastery printing house, and in Belgrade printing house in 1552, and also in Mrkšina crkva printing house in 1562. Despite the retained archaic forms and vocabulary, these texts were understandable to the people. Meanwhile, the first modern printed Bible was of Atanasije Stojković (published by the Russian Bible Society at Saint Petersburg, 1824) but was not written in the vernacular Serbian, but was a mixture of Church Slavonic and Serbian. Stojković later translated the New Testament to Serbian in 1830. A more popular translation of the New Testament by Vuk Karadžić was published in Vienna in 1847, and was combined with the translation of the Old Testament of 1867 by Đuro Daničić in Belgrade, printed together in 1868.

Other subsequent translations are the following:
 Lujo Bakotić, 1933, complete Bible
 Dimitrije Stefanović, 1934, New Testament
 Emilijan Čarnić, 1973, New Testament; Psalms, 1985.
 Serbian Orthodox Synod, 1984, New Testament
 Aleksandar Birviš, Matthew through John, 1987; Psalms, 1990; Genesis, 2003; Hebrews, 2003; Lamentations, 2005; Isaiah, 2006

Comparison

See also
Slavic translations of the Bible
Bible translations into Croatian

References

Sources

External links 

Complete Đuro daničić/Vuk Karadžić translation
New Testament translation by Emilijan Čarnić, Belgrade, 1992

Serbian literature
Serbian